The following are the winners of the 39th annual (2012) Origins Award, presented at Origins 2013:

Hall of Fame Game Inductees
 Munchkin by Steve Jackson Games
 Dominion by Rio Grande Games

Hall of Fame
 Lisa Stevens - Paizo Publishing
 Loren Coleman - Catalyst Game Labs

External links
 2012 Origins Awards Winners and Nominees
 ICv2 - Origins Awards Winners

2012 awards
 
2012 awards in the United States